Khulna Metropolitan Police (KMP), is a metropolitan police unit of Bangladesh Police for the Khulna Metropolitan Area based in Khulna City.

History 
The Khulna Metropolitan Police was established on 1 July 1986 by the Khulna Metropolitan Police Ordinance, 1985.

Crimes increased in 2003 after the removal of joint forces following the end of Operation Clean Heart.

On 26 June 2004, a constable of Khulna Metropolitan Police was injured at a bomb attack at Arya Dharmasava Temple during Ratha Jatra festival.

Khulna Metropolitan Police provided protection for Mizanur Rahman Mizan, general secretary of Awami League Khulna city unit, and Ajmol Ahmed Tapan, panel mayor of Khulna following the assassination a councilor of Khulna.

Khulna Metropolitan Police announced plans to establish a wanted list on their website in February 2010. In May 2011, Bangladesh High Court warned two police officers of Khulna Metropolitan Police beating and electrocuting a nine year during interrogation after he was detained on suspicion of theft.

In April 2012, the officer in charge of Khulna Sadar Police Station, SM Kamruzzaman, and three constables were suspended after a photo emerged of them torturing two student activists of Bangladesh Jatiyatabadi Chhatra Dal, the student front of Bangladesh Nationalist Party, ahead of a strike. The students were from Brajalal College and Azam Khan Government Commerce College.

Khulna Metropolitan Police arrested Khulna City Corporation Mayor and Bangladesh Nationalist Party politician Moniruzzaman Moni on charges of attacking police and vandalizing their vehicle. Following his arrest, Moni was suspended from the post of mayor by Minister of Local Government, Rural Development and Cooperatives.

In May 2018, Bangladesh Nationalist Party called for the removal of the commissioner of Khulna Metropolitan Police ahead of the national elections to ensure fair poling. A report by the Prime Minister's Office found involvement of police officers and Awami League politicians in drug dealing in Khulna. Khulna Metropolitan Police Commissioner Humayun Kabir was withdrawn by Election Commission following a complaint of the Jatiya Okiya Front in November.

In April 2019, Khulna Metropolitan Police clashed with jute mill workers on strike in Khulna.

Police arrested two students of Khulna University for their involving in bombing an office of Bangladesh Krishak League and a police garage in January 2020. They were involved with Neo-Jama'at Mujahideen Bangladesh and their attacks were claimed by the Islamic State according to the SITE Intelligence Group. The Khulna Metropolitan Police purchased four sedans and two microbuses to expand their vehicle pool in July. The officer in charge of Khulna Sadar Police Station, Aslam Bahar Bulbul, was suspended over negligence of duty following the murder of Dr Abdur Rakib Khan at the hands of family members of a patient.

In October 2022, Khulna Metropolitan Police detained Bangladesh Nationalist Party activists before a grand rally of the party. The police action in coordination with a transport strike was designed to hinder the rally of the party.

Stations
Khulna Metropolitan Police (KMP) has 8 police stations called thanas. Three new thanas were created in 2013 for Labanchara, Khulna University and Arangghata.
The thanas are:
Khulna Sadar Thana
Sonadanga Thana
Daulatpur Thana
Khalishpur Thana
Khan Jahan Ali Thana
Labanchara Thana
Harintana Thana
Aranghata Thana

See also
 Khulna City Corporation
 Khulna Development Authority
 Metropolitan Police (Bangladesh)

References 

1986 establishments in Bangladesh
Khulna
Municipal law enforcement agencies of Bangladesh